Ann Evans (c.1840–4 July 1916) was a New Zealand nurse, midwife and refreshment rooms proprietor. She was born in Manchester, Lancashire, England on c.1840. She nursed the chief Titokowaru while he was in hiding.

References

1840s births
1916 deaths
New Zealand nurses
New Zealand midwives
People in health professions from Manchester
19th-century New Zealand people
New Zealand women nurses
British emigrants to New Zealand